Theo Koenen (11 February 1890 – 8 September 1964) was a German international footballer.

References

1890 births
1964 deaths
Association football defenders
German footballers
Germany international footballers